Global Underground 012: Dave Seaman, Buenos Aires is a DJ mix album in the Global Underground series, compiled and mixed by Dave Seaman. The mix is a retrospective look at a set at the Pacha club in Buenos Aires, Argentina.

Dave Seaman arrives for the first of what turns out to be string of GU City releases spanning subsequent years. When asked which city he'd like to base it around, without hesitation he plumps for the burgeoning clubbing destination of Argentina’s capital, a place where the crowds are famously wild, vocal and like to stay packing out the floor until the final record has finished.

This mix takes in classics of the day like Underworld’s ‘Jumbo’ and Polaroid’s ‘So Damn Beautiful’ combined with some serious underground cuts for a fully rounded example of why Dave had risen to become one of the most in-demand spinners on the planet.

The Channel 4 film crew making the infamous documentary about GU came along to shoot at the party. The vibe was so electric that Dave got a little carried away, busting out the breakdancing moves of his early youth on the packed Terrace for the cameras. The following day it transpired he had put his back out in the process.

Track listing

Disc one 
 Underworld - "Jumbo" – 10:55
 Timo Maas vs Ian Wilkie - "Twin Town" – 4:30
 Dutch Liquid - "Rush" – 6:38
 Dutch Liquid - "Smooth Groove" – 5:41
 Deep Cover - "Breakthrough" – 6:52
 Funk Function - "Empress Zero" – 4:45
 Enzo Scifo - "I'm Alive (Mara's Dub)" – 5:42
 Expansion - "Feel" – 7:14
 Poloroid - "So Damn Beautiful (Amethyst Mix)" – 6:29
 Gypsy - "I Trance You (Pappa & Gilbey Mix)" – 7:07
 Ambassador - "The Fade (Oliver Lieb Mix)" – 5:43

Disc two 
 Adamski & Gerideau - "One of the People (Force Mass Motion Mix)" – 8:48
 Life on Mars - "Life in Minds (Evolution Mix)" – 1:54
 Red Shift - "Descender" – 7:11
 Planisphere - "Deep Blue Dream" – 7:23
 Christian West - "Eterna" – 7:44
 Origin - "Refined Intricacy '99" – 12:25
 Jarmel - "Tranquility Bay (Hellpass Remix)" – 7:01
 Coffee Boys - "Nipple Fish (Funk Function Mix)" – 7:25
 Polarity - "Feeling" – 3:35
 The Light - "Opium" – 7:37

References

External links 

Dave Seaman albums
1999 live albums
Global Underground
DJ mix albums
Live albums recorded in Buenos Aires